Maymah or Meymeh may refer to:
 Meymeh, a city in Isfahan Province
 Meymeh District, in Isfahan Province
 Meymeh, Ilam
 Meymah, Markazi